The first season of Brazil's Next Top Model premiered on 3 October 2007 on Sony Entertainment Television. Filming for the season took place from August to September 2007. Model Fernanda Motta served as the show's host, with a panel consisting of photographer Paulo Borges, journalist Erika Palomino, and designer Alexandre Herchcovitch. Artistic director Carlos Pazetto served as the contestants' mentor throughout the competition.

The prizes for this season included a R$200,000 modeling contract with Ford Models, and an editorial spread and the cover of Elle Brasil. The winner of the competition was 20 year-old Mariana Velho from Santos, São Paulo.

Cast

Contestants
(Ages stated are at start of contest)

Judges
 Fernanda Motta (host)
 Paulo Borges
 Alexandre Herchcovitch
 Erika Palomino

Other cast members
 Carlos Pazetto

Episodes

Results

 The contestant was eliminated
 The contestant won the competition

Notes

References

External links
 Official Website 

Brazil's Next Top Model
2007 Brazilian television seasons
Television shows filmed in São Paulo (state)
Television shows filmed in Bahia